Shermon Lewis (born 21 October 1995) is a West Indian cricketer. He made his first-class debut for the Windward Islands in the 2016–17 Regional Four Day Competition on 10 March 2017. In November 2017, he took his maiden five-wicket haul in first-class cricket, bowling for the Windward Islands against Trinidad and Tobago in the 2017–18 Regional Four Day Competition. He made his List A debut for the West Indies A against the England Lions in a tri-series on 28 June 2018.

In September 2018, he was added to the West Indies' Test squad for the series against India. He made his Test debut against India on 4 October 2018.

In October 2019, he was named in the Windward Islands' squad for the 2019–20 Regional Super50 tournament.

In May 2022, he was named in the West Indies One Day International (ODI) squads for their series against the Netherlands and Pakistan. He made his ODI debut on 4 June 2022, for the West Indies against the Netherlands.

References

External links
 

1995 births
Living people
Grenadian cricketers
West Indies Test cricketers
West Indies One Day International cricketers
Windward Islands cricketers